Ultimo Mondo Cannibale (Last Cannibal World) may refer to:

Ultimo mondo cannibale, a 1977 cannibal film directed by Ruggero Deodato
Ultimo Mondo Cannibale (album), an album by the grindcore band Impetigo

See also:
Mondo Cannibale, a 1980 cannibal film directed by Jesús Franco